Herschel Hendler Steinberg (14 December 1890 – 13 January 1968), known professionally as Herschel Henlere, was a Canadian-born pianist, who had a career as a comic entertainer in American vaudeville and then in British variety shows, billed as "The Mirthful Music Master".

Life and career
He was born in Waterloo, Ontario, of Russian Jewish heritage, and moved to New Jersey in childhood.  He began his musical career in New York as the accompanying pianist to the singer Anna Held.  He soon developed his own novelty act, taking popular songs and playing them in a wide variety of musical styles, with quick transitions between one tune and the next, commenting in a purported French-Canadian accent.  He had a successful career in American vaudeville making recordings and piano rolls, and also composed tunes, notably "Kismet", described as an "Arabian foxtrot" and recorded by several bands in the 1920s.

From the 1920s, he spent most of his time in Britain, where he became a leading attraction in variety shows in the late 1920s and 1930s.  He was notorious in show business circles for over-running his allotted time slot; he was often put last on the bill so that if necessary theatre managers could end the show by closing the curtains on him. 

One review of a 1934 theatre performance stated:All Henlere's fooling at his own handsome grand piano cannot disguise his complete mastery of the instrument, whether he be giving what is generally recognised as 'good' music, or 'jizz' as this magnetic French-Canadian calls modern popular numbers in his peculiar manner of talk.  One minute he has the audience in fits of laughter with his comic asides, the next they sit entranced as he deftly fingers a delicate piece by Liszt or Chopin.  Syncopated music comes just as easily to him in a way which makes every foot tap the floor in rhythm.  Perhaps the highlight was a brilliantly-arranged medley in which he led the audience through a mass of popular numbers, one chorus being merged into another before they knew it had happened.

It was claimed of him: "A Salvador Dalí look-alike, he drew on Surrealist and Dada aesthetics and on the ragtime, jazz, big band, and dance hall phenomena that were then sweeping Britain. Experimenting with percussive sound, he anticipated the prepared piano of John Cage."   He also appeared in films, including Soldiers of the King (1933) and Crazy People (1934).  He continued to perform in Britain, and made broadcasts on BBC radio, until the 1950s, and appeared in the 1957 Royal Variety Performance.   

He died in London in 1968, aged 77.

References

External links
 
 
  1936 performance

1890 births
1968 deaths
Canadian male comedians
20th-century Canadian pianists
Canadian male pianists
Canadian jazz pianists